The curve-billed scythebill (Campylorhamphus procurvoides) is a species of bird in the ovenbird family.
It is found in Amazonia. Its natural habitat is subtropical or tropical moist lowland forests.

Taxonomy and systematics
Six subspecies are currently recognized:
C. p. sanus Zimmer, JT, 1934: Found in north-western Amazonia
C. p. gyldenstolpei Aleixo et al., 2013: Proposed as a separate species, called the Tupana scythebill; found in western Amazonia.
C. p. procurvoides (Lafresnaye, 1850): Found in north-eastern Amazonia
C. p. probatus Zimmer, JT, 1934: Found in south-western Amazonia in the Madeira-Tapajós interfluvium 
C. p. cardosoi Portes et al., 2013: Proposed as a separate species. Found in south-central Amazonian Brazil in the Tapajós-Xingu interfluvium
C. p. multostriatus (Snethlage, E, 1907): Found in south-eastern Amazonia

References

curve-billed scythebill
Birds of the Guianas
Birds of the Amazon Basin
Birds of the Colombian Amazon
Birds of the Venezuelan Amazon
curve-billed scythebill
Taxonomy articles created by Polbot
Taxa named by Frédéric de Lafresnaye